= Fashion line =

Fashion line could refer to:

- A fashion designer's haute couture line
- A fashion designer's or fashion house's ready-to-wear line, which may or may not refer to a climate season
